Antonio Rossi (1700–1753) was an Italian painter of the late-Baroque or Rococo period, active mainly in Bologna. He was a pupil first of the painter Lorenzo Bergonzoni, and then of Marcantonio Franceschini.  He was a member of the Accademia Clementina. He painted for the Basilica of San Domenico in Bologna.

References

1700 births
1753 deaths
18th-century Italian painters
Italian male painters
Painters from Bologna
Italian Baroque painters
Rococo painters
18th-century Italian male artists